Annetta Kapon is an artist who works in Sculpture, Installation and Video.

She has had solo exhibitions the Armstrong/Schoenheit Gallery and the Centre d'Art Marnay Art Center.

She is the recipient of a California Community Foundation grant.

Collections
Benton Museum of Art, Untitled Cameras
Museum of Contemporary Art, North Miami, Your Balance
UCR/California Museum of Photography, Indoor

References

Year of birth missing (living people)
Living people
American installation artists
Greek emigrants to the United States
American women video artists
American video artists
Artists from Athens
Greek sculptors
Otis College of Art and Design faculty
21st-century American women artists
21st-century Greek women artists
American women academics